The 1968 Calgary Stampeders finished in 2nd place in the Western Conference with a 10–6 record. They appeared in the Grey Cup where they lost to the Ottawa Rough Riders.

Regular season

Season Standings

Season schedule

Playoffs

West Semi-Final

West Final

 Calgary wins the best of three series 2–0. The Stampeders will advance to the Grey Cup Championship game.

Grey Cup

Awards and records

1968 CFL All-Stars
TE – Herman Harrison, CFL All-Star
LB – Wayne Harris, CFL All-Star
DB – Frank Andruski, CFL All-Star

References

Calgary Stampeders seasons
N. J. Taylor Trophy championship seasons
1968 Canadian Football League season by team